Tashlykul (Taşlıkül) is a rural locality (a village) in Meleuzovsky Selsoviet, Meleuzovsky District, Bashkortostan, Russia. The population was 141 as of 2010. There are 17 streets.

Geography 
Tashlykul is located 8 km south of Meleuz (the district's administrative centre) by road. Tamyan is the nearest rural locality.

References 

Rural localities in Meleuzovsky District